Gordon Waters (27 January 1914 – 15 May 1983) was an  Australian rules footballer who played with Hawthorn in the Victorian Football League (VFL).

Initially from Wedderburn, Waters was signed   He tried out at Footscray and played in some trial games before being offered a place on the Melbourne reserves list.
Waters and fellow teammate Ken Feltscheer were part of a player swap for Bert Chandler in 1937.

The rugged defender was give 3 votes by the Argus sportswriter for his game against  in 1938.

Notes

External links 

1914 births
1983 deaths
Australian rules footballers from Victoria (Australia)
Hawthorn Football Club players